West Sioux Community School District, or West Sioux Schools, is a rural public school district headquartered in Hawarden, Iowa. It operates Ireton Elementary School,  Hawarden Elementary School, and West Sioux Middle School/High School in Hawarden.

The district is mostly in Sioux County with a small section in Plymouth County. The district includes Hawarden, Ireton, and Chatsworth.

History
The first country school in Sioux County, Iowa, was built by 1869 in Calliope. The educational institution was rebuilt in 1881 and moved in 1883. After the third building burned down, the school relocated again. By the 1890s, Hawarden High School had been built.

A consolidated school district known as the Chatsworth–Hawarden–Ireton Rural Community School District was proposed in 1958. Before the district was established, the name had been changed to West Sioux. The first school board election was as a consolidated school district was held in January 1959. The West Sioux Community School District began operations on July 1, 1959. West Sioux High School was also established in 1959. It began classes in what was the Hawarden High School, and served as the secondary school for the West Sioux Community School District.

At the time of its consolidation, Roger Blake served as superintendent of West Sioux. Doyle Carpenter became superintendent in 1968, and was succeeded by Gerald Bradley in 1973. Bradley served through 1990, and vacated the position by 1991. By 1998, David Looysen had become superintendent at West Sioux. Looysen left West Sioux after four years, and was replaced by Paul Olson. Olson retired after the 2010 school year, and Gary Richardson took on a dual superintendency between MOC–Floyd Valley and West Sioux. Randy Collins became superintendent of West Sioux in 2012, and concurrently served in the same role at Akron–Westfield Community School District. Though Collins remained with Akron–Westfield, he left West Sioux in 2016. Ryan Kramer  was named superintendent for the 2016–17 school year, and served as superintendent until 2019. Steve Grond, who was superintendent of Boyden-Hull School District, assumed a dual superintendency at Boyden–Hull and West Sioux in 2020.

Schools
The district operates four schools:
Hawarden Elementary School, Hawarden
Ireton Elementary School, Ireton
West Sioux Middle School, Hawarden
West Sioux High School, Hawarden

West Sioux High School

Athletics
The Falcons compete in the War Eagle Conference in the following sports:
Cross Country
 Boys' 2-time State Champions (1961, 1999)
Volleyball
Football
 2-time State Champions (2017, 2018)
Bowling
Basketball
Wrestling
Track and Field
Golf 
Soccer
Baseball
Softball

Enrollment

Notable alumni
 Brian Hansen, former American football punter in the National Football League

See also
List of school districts in Iowa
List of high schools in Iowa

References

External links
 West Sioux Community School District
 

School districts in Iowa
Education in Plymouth County, Iowa
Education in Sioux County, Iowa
1959 establishments in Iowa
School districts established in 1959